Schisandra repanda is a deciduous vine growing to 6 meters, endemic to Japan and Korea.

Synonyms
 Maximowiczia nigra (Maxim.) Nakai
 Schisandra discolor Nakai
 Schisandra nigra Maxim.

References

 Sitzungsber. Math.-Phys. Cl. Königl. Bayer. Akad. Wiss. München 16: 303 1886.
 JSTOR

External links
 
 
 

repanda
Flora of Japan
Flora of Korea